Harold Patrick Egan (28 November 1884 – 29 July 1966) was an Australian rules footballer who played with St Kilda in the Victorian Football League (VFL).

Family
The son of Michael Thomas Egan, and Sarah Ann Egan, Harold Patrick Egan was born in Carlton, Victoria on 28 November 1884.

He married Myra Young (1886-1921) in 1913.

Notes

External links 

1884 births
1966 deaths
Australian rules footballers from Melbourne
St Kilda Football Club players
People from Carlton, Victoria